The Chien Français Tricolore translated into English as the French Tricolour Hound, is a breed of dog of the scenthound type, originating in France. The breed is used for hunting in packs.

Appearance 
The breed is a typical large French hunting pack hound, with a lean and muscular body, long legs, elongated head with a noticeable occipital protuberance, long drop ears, and slightly square flews.

The coat is tricolour, with a wide black mantle, and tan parts are of a bright colour. A grizzled colour called "louvard" ("wolf-like") is also seen in the breed. Faults are listed as physical or behavioural abnormalities, and a dog with such faults should not be bred. Faults include fat feet, aggression, or any trace of crossing with English hounds.

Use 
The Chien Français Tricolore are pack hunting dogs, which means that groups of dogs are hunted together, always directed by a human, not running about hunting by themselves. Dogs bred to be pack hunting dogs do not usually make good pets.

See also
 Dogs portal
 List of dog breeds
 Anglo-French Hounds
 Dog terminology

References

External links 

Video of Chien Francais Tricolore

FCI breeds
Scent hounds
Dog breeds originating in France